HMS Forester was a Royal Navy 18-gun  built by John King and launched in 1806 at Dover. She had a relatively uneventful career before the Navy sold her in 1819.

Service
Forester entered service in 1806 under Captain John Richards and was sent to act as a convoy escort for ships sailing to the Baltic. During this service Forester also recaptured a British merchant vessel. Off the Netherlands she captured the smuggler Hiram. In 1808 Forester was caught in a gale in which several vessels were wrecked; Forester was also tasked with burning the frigate , one of the vessels that had been wrecked. Soon afterward Forester escorted a convoy to Gorée and was then refitted at Spithead, subsequently sailing to Corunna.

Forester sailed for the West Indies on 29 August 1808. Operating off Barbados, Forester participated in the invasion of Martinique in January 1809. In 1847 the Admiralty awarded all surviving claimants from the campaign the NGSM with clasp "Martinique".

On 31 May 1809 Richards sent boats from his small squadron under the command of Lieutenant Robert Carr of the gun-brig Attentive to capture a French letter of marque and a schooner from under the protection of four long-guns and 300 soldiers at the Port du Molas. Carr captured the vessels and then landed, spiked the guns, and blew up the French magazine.

Command passed to John E. Watt later in 1809, and under his command Forester also participated in the capture of Guadeloupe in January and February 1810. In 1847 the Admiralty awarded the Naval General Service Medal with clasp "Guadaloupe" to all surviving participants of the campaign.

In 1812 Commander Alexander Kennedy replaced Watt. On 23 March 1813 Forester sailed to Jamaica to replace , which had recently returned to Spithead. Foresters orders were to accompany  as escort to a convoy and there to place herself under the orders of Admiral Charles Stirling.

On 5 May  and Forester captured the American privateer Mary Ann off San Domingo. She was armed with a long 9-pounder gun and a 4-pounder. Mary Ann was under the command of Peter Charriol and had a crew of 30, one of whom was found dead. She was 20 days out of Charleston and had made no captures. From the number of small arms on board, Kennedy suspected that Charriol had planned to gather more men.

On 15 May  and Forrester captured the 5-gun Lovely Lass off Jamaica. The capture followed a chase of 19 hours, during which the Lovely Lass threw four of her guns overboard. Her commander was Mr. John Smith of the American Navy, and she had a crew of 60 men. Smith reported that he had been out 44 days and had made no captures. A later report gave her tonnage as 80 tons and her crew as 73 men. She was from Wilmington and Circe sent her to Kingston. On 5 July, Forrester captured the ship Granger.

On 27 November 1813 Forester captured an American schooner of unknown name.

In April 1814, the Navy dismissed Kennedy from Forester and suspended him from his rank for two years for disobeying orders from Rear-Admiral William Brown.  Command then passed to William Hendry. Later that year Commander Alexander Karley replaced Hendry, and then Commander J.M'Dougall replaced Karley.

Fate
In 1817, following the end of the wars, Forester was paid off at Portsmouth. She was sold there on 8 March 1819 to G. Young for £1,130.

Notes

Citations

References
 
Marshall, John (1823–1835) Royal Naval Biography; Or, Memoirs of the Services of All the Flag-officers ... (London: Printed for Longman, Hurst, Rees, Orme, and Brown).

External links
 Michael Phillips - Ships of the Old Navy - Forester

Cruizer-class brig-sloops
Ships built in Kent
1806 ships